Enigmacanthus filamentosus is a species of filefish native to the Marshall Islands and the Seychelles.  This species grows to a length of  SL.  This species is the only known member of its genus.

References

Monacanthidae
Fish described in 2002